Johnson v. Monsanto Co. was the first lawsuit to proceed to trial over Monsanto's Roundup herbicide product causing cancer. The lawsuit alleged that the exposure of glyphosate, an active ingredient in the Roundup product, caused Dewayne "Lee" Johnson's non-Hodgkin lymphoma. In a landmark verdict, Monsanto was ordered by a San Francisco jury to pay $289m in punitive damages and compensatory damages. Monsanto, and after June 2018 Bayer, appealed the verdict several times, but lost. The award was cut to $78 million, then reduced to $21 million after appeal.

Background 
Dewayne “Lee” Johnson, the plaintiff in this case, sprayed hundreds of gallons of RoundUp over the course of his career as a school groundskeeper in Benicia, California. On one occasion, one of the sprayers he was using broke and he was drenched in RoundUp. In 2014 at age 42, Johnson was diagnosed with non-Hodgkin lymphoma, which he alleged at trial was caused by the pesticide exposure. In 2017, he was given a terminal diagnosis and was told that he would only live another 6 months. Due to this diagnosis, his trial was expedited.

Cancer risk assessments of glyphosate 
There is limited evidence that human cancer risk might increase as a result of occupational exposure to large amounts of glyphosate, such as agricultural work, but no good evidence of such a risk from home use, such as in domestic gardening. The consensus among national pesticide regulatory agencies and scientific organizations is that labeled uses of glyphosate have demonstrated no evidence of human carcinogenicity. Organizations such as the Joint FAO/WHO Meeting on Pesticide Residues and the European Commission, Canadian Pest Management Regulatory Agency, and the German Federal Institute for Risk Assessment have concluded that there is no evidence that glyphosate poses a carcinogenic or genotoxic risk to humans. The final assessment of the Australian Pesticides and Veterinary Medicines Authority in 2017 was that "glyphosate does not pose a carcinogenic risk to humans". The EPA has evaluated the carcinogenic potential of glyphosate multiple times since 1986. In 1986, glyphosate was initially classified as Group C: "Possible Human Carcinogen", but later recommended as Group D: "Not Classifiable as to Human Carcinogenicity" due to lack of statistical significance in previously examined rat tumor studies. In 1991, it was classified as Group E: "Evidence of Non-Carcinogenicity for Humans", and in 2015 and 2017, "Not Likely to be Carcinogenic to Humans".

Timeline

See also
Monsanto legal cases
Into the Weeds – 2022 documentary film

References 

 
2018 in United States case law